The Isaac W. Dyer Estate is a historic property at 180 Fort Hill Road in Gorham, Maine.  The property consists of an 1850s Greek Revival house, and a collection of farm-related outbuildings and landscaping added in the early 20th century as part of a transformation of the property into gentleman's farm by Isaac Watson Dyer, a prominent Portland lawyer.  The property was listed on the National Register of Historic Places in 1998.

Description and history
The Dyer Estate is located north of Gorham center, on the west side of Fort Hill Road (Maine State Route 114), the main northbound route from the center. Landscaped features of the property include a pond, impounded by an earthen dam at its south end, a croquet lawn bordered by a cedar hedge, and a walled garden. The house is a 2-1/2 story Greek Revival structure, with a side gable roof, twin interior chimneys, and clapboard siding. It has a single-story porch extending across its front and south sides.

The construction date of the house is not known with certainty, but local records show that the original house was built ~1783-5; later renovations and extensions were added, with the current Greek-revival facade and porch being added probably sometime in the 1850s, by one of two known owners during that period. This property was Dyer's summer estate, and about 1900 he began a major transformation, building most of the outbuildings and landscaped features visible today. These types of built-up summer "gentleman's farm" properties are increasingly rare in the state, and the Dyer estate is notable as one of the few known that includes a walled garden.

See also
National Register of Historic Places listings in Cumberland County, Maine

References

Houses on the National Register of Historic Places in Maine
Greek Revival architecture in Maine
Houses completed in 1850
Houses in Cumberland County, Maine
Buildings and structures in Gorham, Maine
National Register of Historic Places in Cumberland County, Maine
Historic districts on the National Register of Historic Places in Maine